Maffeo Pantaleoni (Frascati, 2 July 1857Milan, 29 October 1924) was an Italian economist. At first he was a notable proponent of neoclassical economics. Later in his life, before and during World War I, he became an ardent nationalist and syndicalist, with close ties to the Fascist movement. He was Minister of Finance in the Carnaro government of Gabriele D'Annunzio at Fiume, which lasted for fifteen months between 1919 and 1920. Shortly before his death, he was elected to the Italian Senate.

Work
Pantaleoni was a major contributor to the Italian school of economics known as 'La Scienza delle Finanze'. His book Teoria della Traslazione dei Tributi (theory of tax shifting) is a pioneering study of tax incidence.  According to Nobel prize winner James M. Buchanan, Pantaleoni and his followers (such as Antonio De Viti De Marco and  Vilfredo Pareto) can be considered the intellectual forefathers of the modern public choice theory.

Family
Maffeo's great grandniece is American actress Téa Leoni.

Bibliography (selection)

 Teoria della traslazione dei tributi, 1882.
 Contributions to the Theory of the Distribution of Public Expenditure, 1883.
 Dell'ammontare probabile della ricchezza privata in Italia, 1884.
 Pure Economics, 1889. . 
 A proposito di Luigi Cossa e della sua "Histoire des Doctrines économiques", 1898, GdE.
 Dei criteri che devono informare la storia delle dottrine economiche, 1898, GdE.
 An attempt to analyze the concepts of "Strong" and "Weak" in their economic connexion, 1898, EJ.
 Una visione cinematografica del progresso della scienza economica, 1870–1907, 1907, GdE.
 Note in Margine della Guerra, 1917.
 Politica, 1918.
 Erotemi di Economica, 1925.

References

External links
 Maffeo Pantaleoni at the New School

1857 births
1924 deaths
People from Frascati
Italian politicians
Historians of economic thought
19th-century Italian economists
20th-century Italian economists
19th-century Italian male writers
20th-century Italian male writers
Writers from Lazio
Giornale degli economisti e annali di economia editors